Heteromeringia nitida is a species of fly in the family Clusiidae.

Distribution
United States, Mexico.

Subspecies
These two subspecies belong to the species Heteromeringia nitida:
 Heteromeringia nitida nigripes Melander & Argo
 Heteromeringia nitida nitida

References

Clusiidae
Insects described in 1913
Taxa named by Charles Willison Johnson
Diptera of North America